The Texas Tech Matadors basketball teams represented Texas Technological College (now Texas Tech University) in the college basketball seasons of 1925–26 to 1934–35.

1925–26

Source:

1926–27

Source:

1927–28

Source:

1928–29

Source:

1929–30

Source:

1930–31

Source:

1931–32

Source:

1932–33

Source:

1933–34

Source:

1934–35

Source:

References

Texas Tech Red Raiders basketball seasons